Lawrence Geoffrey Power,  (August 9, 1841 – September 12, 1921) was a Canadian lawyer and politician.

Born in Halifax, Nova Scotia, the son of Patrick Power and Ellen Gaul, he was educated at St. Mary's Knockbeg College, Carlow College, the Catholic University of Ireland and Harvard University and was admitted to the bar in 1866. In 1880, he married Susan O'Leary. He served as a member of Halifax town council and of the school board. He also served as a member of the senate for Dalhousie University. Power was appointed to the Senate of Canada representing the senatorial division of Halifax, Nova Scotia in 1877. A Liberal, he was Speaker of the Senate from 1901 to 1905.

He died in office in 1921.

References

 Allison, D & Tuck, CE History of Nova Scotia, Vol. 3 (1916) pp. 225–6

External links
 

1841 births
1921 deaths
Harvard University alumni
Alumni of Carlow College
Canadian senators from Nova Scotia
Canadian people of Irish descent
Liberal Party of Canada senators
Speakers of the Senate of Canada
People from Halifax, Nova Scotia
Members of the King's Privy Council for Canada